Pleurogorgia is a genus of corals belonging to the family Chrysogorgiidae.

The species of this genus are found in Paciic Ocean.

Species:

Pleurogorgia militaris 
Pleurogorgia plana

References

Chrysogorgiidae
Octocorallia genera